Wynton Allen Bernard (born September 24, 1990) is an American professional baseball outfielder in the Toronto Blue Jays organization. He has previously played in Major League Baseball (MLB) for the Colorado Rockies.

Amateur career
Bernard attended Rancho Bernardo High School in Poway, California. He received an athletic scholarship to attend Niagara University and play college baseball for the Niagara Purple Eagles. As a freshman, Bernard had a .293 batting average and led the team in stolen bases. He transferred to Riverside Community College after the season because his father had a stroke and he wanted to be closer to his family. Bernard's father died after his sophomore year, and he transferred back to Niagara for his junior year. For Niagara, Bernard compiled a .279 average and 72 stolen bases in 140 games from 2009 to 2012.

Professional career

San Diego Padres
The San Diego Padres selected Bernard in the 35th round of the 2012 MLB draft. He played in the Padres' farm system during 2012 and 2013, advancing to the Class A-Advanced level. The Padres released Bernard in February 2014. He signed with the Detroit Tigers in March 2014. He played for the Low-A West Michigan Whitecaps in 2014, and was named the Most Valuable Player of the Midwest League. He played for the Double-A Erie SeaWolves in 2015 and the Triple-A Toledo Mud Hens in 2016.

Giants and Cubs organization
He later spent time in the San Francisco Giants organization during 2017, and the Chicago Cubs organization during 2018 and 2019. He did not play in Minor League Baseball during 2020, due to cancellation of the minor-league season.

Colorado Rockies
Bernard signed with the Colorado Rockies in January 2021, and spent the 2021 season with the Triple-A Albuquerque Isotopes. He returned to Albuquerque for the 2022 season. He was notified that he was being called up on August 11, 2022, and was officially added to the Rockies' MLB roster on August 12. He made his major-league debut that evening, recording a hit, stolen base, and run scored. After recording a base hit and a stolen base, he became the oldest player to do so in their major league debut since 1907. He elected free agency on November 10, 2022.

Toronto Blue Jays
On January 24, 2023, Bernard signed a minor league contract with the Toronto Blue Jays organization.

International career
In addition to playing for various minor-league teams in the United States, Bernard has also played professionally in Mexico, Venezuela, the Dominican Republic, and Australia.

Personal life
Bernard has two older brothers: Walter played for the New Mexico Lobos in college and in the National Football League, and Wayne played professional basketball in Europe.

Bernard appeared on the TV game show Family Feud in 2011.

References

External links

1990 births
Living people
Baseball players from San Diego
Major League Baseball outfielders
Colorado Rockies players
Águilas de Mexicali players
Águilas del Zulia players
Albuquerque Isotopes players
Arizona League Padres players
Brisbane Bandits players
Erie SeaWolves players
Eugene Emeralds players
Fort Wayne TinCaps players
Iowa Cubs players
Lake Elsinore Storm players
Leones del Caracas players
Niagara Purple Eagles baseball players
Sacramento River Cats players
Sultanes de Monterrey players
Sugar Land Skeeters players
Tennessee Smokies players
Tigres del Licey players
Toledo Mud Hens players
West Michigan Whitecaps players
American expatriate baseball players in Mexico
American expatriate baseball players in Venezuela
American expatriate baseball players in the Dominican Republic
American expatriate baseball players in Australia
African-American baseball players
Rancho Bernardo High School alumni